Odostomia disparilis is a species of sea snail, a marine gastropod mollusc in the family Pyramidellidae, the pyrams and their allies.

Description
The shell of this micromollusc grows to a length of 3.2 mm.

Distribution
This species occurs in the following locations:
 Northwest Atlantic off North Carolina, USA

Notes
Additional information regarding this species:
 Distribution: off Cape Hatteras, N.C.

References

External links
 To Biodiversity Heritage Library (9 publications)
 To Encyclopedia of Life
 To USNM Invertebrate Zoology Mollusca Collection
 To ITIS
 To World Register of Marine Species

disparilis
Gastropods described in 1884